KOZY-FM (101.3 FM, "The Bluffs Hit Music Station") is a radio station broadcasting a Top 40 (CHR) music format. Licensed to Bridgeport, Nebraska, in the United States, the station is currently owned by the Nebraska Rural Radio Association.

Ownership
In May 2013, Armada Media and Legacy Broadcasting traded some stations in Nebraska, with two stations in Holdrege (KUVR/1380 and KMTY/97.7) going to Legacy and eight others in the Scottsbluff and North Platte markets [KZTL/93.5 (Paxton-North Platte) and KRNP/100.7 (Sutherland-North Platte)  KOAQ/690 (Terrytown), KOLT/1320 (Scottsbluff), KMOR/93.3 (Gering), KETT/99.3 (Mitchell), KOZY-FM/101.3 (Bridgeport), KHYY/106.9 (Minatare)] going to Armada Media. As of January 17, 2020, KOZY was owned by the Nebraska Rural Radio Association.

Programming

Weekdays 
Morning Kick with Nick 5-9 AM

DJ TJ 9 AM-2 PM

Weekends 
American Top 40 Saturday 6-10 AM

Backtrax USA Sunday 5-7 PM

Sonrise Sun 8-10 AM

Weekends with Roula Sun 10 AM-1 PM

Daly Download Sun 1-5 PM

Open House Party Sunday 7 PM-Midnight

References

External links

OZY-FM
Contemporary hit radio stations in the United States
Morrill County, Nebraska